The Christian Democratic Front is a small political party in São Tomé and Príncipe. It failed to win any seats in the National Assembly following elections held on 26 March 2006.

The party supported Fradique de Menezes in the 30 July 2006 presidential election. He was re-elected with 60.58% of the vote.

The discovery of a coup plot against Menezes, allegedly involving Christian Democratic Front leader Arlecio Costa, was announced on 12 February 2009. Costa and more than 30 others were arrested.

References

Christian democratic parties in Africa
Political parties in São Tomé and Príncipe